The 2022 AFC Women's Asian Cup was the 20th edition of the AFC Women's Asian Cup, the quadrennial international women's football tournament in Asia competed by the national teams in the Asian Football Confederation (AFC).

India was selected as the host nation by the AFC Women's Football Committee in June 2020. It was the first time that the country hosted the competition since 1979. On 28 January 2021, the AFC confirmed that the tournament would take place between 20 January and 6 February 2022, instead of the original scheduled dates of late October and early November.

For the first time in the competition, the final tournament was expanded from eight teams to twelve. It served as the final stage of Asian qualification for the 2023 FIFA Women's World Cup in Australia and New Zealand (Regulations Article 4.6), in which Australia already qualifying automatically as co-hosts. Five teams qualified directly for the World Cup via the knockout stage and two more advanced to the inter-confederation play-offs.

Japan were the two-time defending champions, but were eliminated in the semi-finals by China PR on penalties. The Chinese went on to win the ninth title in their history by defeating South Korea 3–2 in the final.

Host selection
The following three football associations submitted their interest to host the tournament by the 31 May 2019 deadline.

India had previously hosted the 1980 AFC Women's Championship, originally scheduled for 1979, while Chinese Taipei hosted the 1977 and 2001 editions of the tournament.

India was recommended for hosting the tournament by the AFC Women's Football Committee on 19 February 2020. On 5 June 2020, the country was awarded the hosting rights.

Impact of the COVID-19 pandemic
The 2022 AFC Women's Asian Cup was held amid the COVID-19 pandemic which affected the organization of the tournament. As a response, the tournament was held under a bio-secure bubble setup. All participating teams were granted exemption from institutional quarantine when foreigners were normally required to undergo home quarantine for seven days from 11 January 2022. Members of the participating teams underwent initial tests for COVID-19 upon arrival. They were required to stay in their hotels while they awaited their test results. Following negative test results, the movement of players and officials were restricted to the hotel, and the training and match venues.

Several teams reported positive COVID-19 cases during the tournament, namely China, India, Japan, South Korea, Myanmar, the Philippines, and Vietnam. Host India were the most affected, with as many as 12 players testing positive for COVID-19, rendering them unable to name 13 players for their match against Chinese Taipei, as required. India was forced to withdraw due to tournament regulations.

Qualification

The host country India and the top three teams of the previous tournament in 2018 qualified automatically, while the other eight teams were decided by qualification matches played in September and October 2021.

Qualified teams
The following twelve teams qualified for the tournament:

Match officials
On 6 January 2022, the AFC announced the list of 16 referees, 16 assistant referees, two stand-by referees, two stand-by assistant referees and six video match officials for the tournament. Video assistant referees (VAR) would be used from the quarter-finals onwards.

Originally, Law Bik Chi (Hong Kong) was selected for the tournament. However, she was unable to travel to India due to travel restriction. She was replaced by Wang Chieh (Chinese Taipei).

Referees

  Casey Reibelt
  Lara Lee
  Kate Jacewicz
  Qin Liang
  Wang Chieh
  Ranjita Devi Tekcham
  Mahsa Ghorbani
  Mahnaz Zokaee
  Yoshimi Yamashita
  Asaka Koizumi
  Thein Thein Aye
  Abirami Naidu
  Oh Hyeon-jeong
  Kim Yu-jeong
  Pansa Chaisanit
  Edita Mirabidova

Assistant referees

  Joanna Charaktis
  Fang Yan
  Xie Lijun
  Uvena Fernandes
  Ensieh Khabaz
  Makoto Bozono
  Naomi Teshirogi
  Ramina Tsoi
  Merlo Albano
  Heba Saadieh
  Kim Kyoung-min
  Lee Seul-gi
  Park Mi-suk
  Supawan Hinthong
  Kristina Sereda
  Trương Thị Lệ Trinh

Video assistant referees

  Ali Sabah
  Abdulla Al-Marri
  Kim Hee-gon
  Hanna Hattab
  Sivakorn Pu-Udom
  Omar Al-Ali

Stand-by referees

  Veronika Bernatskaia
  Công Thị Dung

Stand-by assistant referees

  Nuannid Dornjangreed
  Zilola Rahmatova

Venues
The venues for the 2022 AFC Women's Asian Cup were located across three cities in India. Originally, the host cities were Ahmedabad, Bhubaneswar and Navi Mumbai, and the AFC confirmed the three host cities of the event in June 2021. However, on 6 July 2021, AFC announced Mumbai, Navi Mumbai and Pune in Maharashtra would host the tournament. All matches are played behind closed doors as a precaution due to the COVID-19 pandemic.

Draw
The final draw was held on 28 October 2021, 15:00 MYT (UTC+8), at the AFC House in Kuala Lumpur, Malaysia. The twelve teams were drawn into three groups of four teams. The seedings were based on their performance in 2018 AFC Women's Asian Cup final tournament and qualification, with the hosts India automatically seeded and assigned to Position A1 in the draw.

Squads

Each team has to register a squad of a minimum of 18 players and maximum of 23 players, at least three of whom must be goalkeepers (Regulations Article 26.3).

Group stage
The top two teams of each group and the two best third-placed teams qualified for the quarter finals.

Tiebreakers
Teams were ranked according to points (3 points for a win, 1 point for a draw, 0 points for a loss), and if tied on points, the following tiebreaking criteria were applied, in the order given, to determine the rankings (Regulations Article 7.3):
Points in head-to-head matches among tied teams;
Goal difference in head-to-head matches among tied teams;
Goals scored in head-to-head matches among tied teams;
If more than two teams are tied, and after applying all head-to-head criteria above, a subset of teams are still tied, all head-to-head criteria above are reapplied exclusively to this subset of teams;
Goal difference in all group matches;
Goals scored in all group matches;
Penalty shoot-out if only two teams are tied and they met in the last round of the group;
Disciplinary points (yellow card = 1 point, red card as a result of two yellow cards = 3 points, direct red card = 3 points, yellow card followed by direct red card = 4 points);
Drawing of lots.

All times are local, IST (UTC+5:30).

Group A

Group B

Group C

Ranking of third-placed teams
The top two teams qualified for the quarter finals.
Results against the fourth-placed teams of each group were not counted in determining the ranking of the third-placed teams.

Knockout stage

Bracket
The losers of the quarter-final matches entered play-offs, the format of which depended on Australia's results in the tournament.

Quarter-finals
The winners qualified for the 2023 FIFA Women's World Cup. The losers, with the exception of Australia, entered the play-offs.

Semi-finals

Final

Awards
The following awards were given at the conclusion of the tournament:

Play-offs
The format of the play-offs round depended on the performance of Australia, who qualified automatically for the World Cup as hosts. Since Australia was eliminated in the quarter finals, the play-offs format was for the remaining three quarter-final losers to play a single round-robin play-off. The best team after three matches advanced to the World Cup, and the remaining two teams entered the inter-confederation play-offs.

Statistics

Goalscorers

Tournament teams ranking

Qualified teams for FIFA Women's World Cup
Five teams from the AFC qualified for the 2023 FIFA Women's World Cup, apart from co-hosts Australia which qualified automatically, while two teams advanced to the inter-confederation play-offs.

1 Australia qualified as a member of the OFC in 1995, 1999 and 2003.

Logo and sponsorships
The official logo for the tournament was unveiled by the AFC and the local organising committee on 20 July 2021. The logo features the AFC Women's Asian Cup trophy at the centre, with a "swirl" surrounding the trophy "inspired by the national flags and colours of playing kits in Asia, and the iconic stadiums in which the AFC Women’s Asian Cup is played in and celebrates cultural diversity and the unwavering support and enthusiasm of fans for their national teams". The logo also contains elements inspired by the tournament host country. The maroon colour of the logo is inspired by the art of the Warli people, a tribe native to the northern Western Ghats in the tournament's host state of Maharashtra. Red and maroon colours are often used as the base of Warli paintings. The use of silver in the logo is inspired by the "importance of silver jewellery in Indian households and the beauty and elegance of the precious metal".

The official global partners of the tournament were Continental AG, Credit Saison, Neom, and Yili Group, while Kelme and Konami are official global supporters.

Broadcasting rights

AFC

Rest of the world

References

External links
, the-AFC.com

 
2022
2023 FIFA Women's World Cup qualification
Women's Asian Cup
AFC Women's Asian Cup
2022
International association football competitions hosted by India
January 2022 sports events in India
February 2022 sports events in India
Sports events affected by the COVID-19 pandemic